Dhahan is a village in Shaheed Bhagat Singh Nagar district of Punjab State, India. The village is administrated by Sarpanch an elected representative of the village.

Demography 
As of 2011, Dhahan has a total number of 287 houses and population of 1309 of which 643 include are males while 666 are females according to the report published by Census India in 2011. The literacy rate of Dhahan is 81.38%, higher than the state average of 75.84%. The population of children under the age of 6 years is 138 which is 10.54% of total population of Dhahan, and child sex ratio is approximately 816 as compared to Punjab state average of 846.

Most of the people are from Schedule Caste which constitutes 46.44% of total population in Dhahan. The town does not have any Schedule Tribe population so far.

As per the report published by Census India in 2011, 400 people were engaged in work activities out of the total population of Dhahan which includes 349 males and 51 females. According to census survey report 2011, 98.25% workers describe their work as main work and 1.75% workers are involved in Marginal activity providing livelihood for less than 6 months.

Education 
The village has a private un-aided Punjabi medium, co-ed primary with upper primary and secondary/higher secondary school founded in 1987. The school does not provide mid-day meal.

Guru Nanak College of Nursing is nearby Guru Nanak Mission Public Senior Secondary School Dhahan.

Transport 

See also 
List of villages in India

References

External links 
 Tourism of Punjab
 Census of Punjab
 Locality Based PINCode

Villages in Shaheed Bhagat Singh Nagar district